Oligodon nikhili, known commonly as Nikhil's kukri snake, is a species of snake in the family Colubridae. The species is endemic to the Palni Hills of southern India.

Etymology
Both the specific name, nikhili, and the common name, Nikhil's kukri snake, are in honor of Nikhil Whitaker (born 1979), the son of herpetologist Romulus Whitaker.

References

nikhili
Reptiles of India
Reptiles described in 1982